A cycling jersey is a specialised jersey for cycling. 

The cycling jersey used to be made of wool since the inception of cycling as a sport in the early 1900s, while contemporary jerseys have evolved into technical sportswear that is lightweight,  fitted, made of synthetic and moisture-wicking fabric.

A specialised cycling jersey for the road discipline features the following unique characteristics:

 A longer cut in the back to accommodate the bent-over cycling position
 Pockets on the back panel to prevent spill
 Silicone grippers at the hem to prevent the jersey from moving up the body while cycling
 Full length zip to allow for ventilation
 Tight-fitting cut to eliminate loose fabric and reduce air resistance
 Moisture-wicking material to keep the cyclist cooler and more comfortable

Cycling jerseys are available in various cuts. For instance, a loose 'club cut' offering relaxed fit for recreational cyclists, and a form-fitting 'race cut' featuring a tailored fit that is tighter and shorter. Jerseys for other cycling disciplines such as mountain biking have different characteristics. Looser jerseys allow body armour to be worn beneath. Long sleeve options also provide additional protection against branches and twigs.

Professional cycling is heavily sponsored. Regulations specify the size, colour and the placement of sponsor, national federation and manufacturer logos and other graphics. In professional races, certain colours or patterns have special symbolism that signify the leader or the champion of a race or tour. Numbers are pinned on the back of the jersey for a race.

See also
 Cycling
 Cycling kit
 Distinctive jerseys in professional cycling
 Exercise dress
 Performance fabrics
 Road bicycle racing
 Road cycling
 Spandex
 Sportswear

References 

Cycling jerseys
Clothing_by_function
Sportswear